Tanbara Dam (玉原ダム,  which can be mistakenly read Tamahara Dam) is a rock-fill embankment dam impounding the headwaters of the Hotchi River, a Tone River tributary in Gunma Prefecture of Japan. It creates the upper reservoir for the  Tamahara Pumped Storage Power Station (玉原発電所). Construction began in 1973 and the dam was complete in 1981 while the power station was commissioned in 1986. Of that capacity,  is active (or useful) for power generation. Power is generated during periods of high energy demand and pumping occurs during times when energy demand is low such as at night. The power station contains four  reversible Francis turbine pump-generators which serve to both pump water and generate electricity.

See also

List of power stations in Japan
List of pumped-storage hydroelectric power stations

References

Dams completed in 1981
Dams in Gunma Prefecture
Rock-filled dams
Pumped-storage hydroelectric power stations in Japan